Quasar is an album by American jazz composer and arranger Jimmy Giuffre which was released on the Italian Soul Note label in 1985.

Reception

Scott Yanow of Allmusic states: "Giuffre is heard on clarinet, tenor, soprano, flute and bass flute on eight obscure pieces, including four of his originals. Although often electronic, the music has the typical thoughtfulness of Giuffre's relaxed approach and some picturesque moments".

Track listing 
All compositions by Jimmy Giuffre except as indicated
 "Quasar" (Juanita Odjenar Giuffre) - 5:22
 "Frog Legs" - 5:14
 "Phantom" - 4:58
 "Spirits" - 3:22
 "Wolf Soup" (Bob Nieske) - 4:09
 "Shadows" - 3:38
 "2nd Step" (Juanita Odjenar Giuffre) - 5:42
 "Night Ride" (Pete Levin) - 6:46

Personnel 
Jimmy Giuffre - soprano saxophone, tenor saxophone, clarinet, flute, bass flute
Pete Levin - keyboards
Bob Nieske - bass 
Randy Kaye - drums

References 

Jimmy Giuffre albums
1985 albums
Black Saint/Soul Note albums